"Somebody Told Me" is a 2004 song by The Killers.

Somebody Told Me may also refer to:

 Somebody Told Me, book by Rick Bragg and SIBA Book Award winner
 "Somebody Told Me", song by Teddy Pendergrass
 "Somebody Told Me", song by Jagúar
 "Somebody Told Me", song by Viper from Coma Rage
 "Somebody Told Me", song by Strong Bad from Strong Bad Sings
 "Somebody Told Me", song by Charlie Puth from Voicenotes
 "Somebody Told Me", song by Eurythmics from Sweet Dreams (Are Made of This)
 "Somebody Told Me", song by Will to Power from Will to Power
 "Somebody Told Me", song by Das EFX from album Generation EFX
 "Somebody Told Me", song by Daniel Bedingfield, B-side of "The Way"
 "Somebody Told Me", song by Corky Laing
 "Somebody Told Me", song by Eddie Powers
 "Somebody Told Me", song by Hessel
 "Somebody Told Me", song by Little Milton